The Ngunguru River is a river of the Northland Region of New Zealand's North Island. It initially flows southwest before turning east to flow into a long, wide estuary which empties into Ngunguru Bay to the northwest of Whangārei. The town of Ngunguru sits on the estuary's north bank at its opening to the bay.

See also
List of rivers of New Zealand

References

Rivers of the Northland Region
Rivers of New Zealand